Muttaikota is a village in Medak mandal of Medak district in the Indian state of Telangana.

Villages in Medak district